Narao Peak is a  summit located in British Columbia, Canada.

Description
Narao Peak is situated immediately south-southwest of Kicking Horse Pass and within Yoho National Park. It is part of the Bow Range which is a subrange of the Canadian Rockies. The nearest higher neighbor is Popes Peak,  to the southeast on the Continental Divide. Precipitation runoff from Narao Peak drains into tributaries of the Kicking Horse River. The peak is visible from Highway 1 (the Trans-Canada Highway), and tourists en route to Lake O'Hara pass below the western base of the mountain.

History
The first ascent of the summit was made in 1913 by the Interprovincial Boundary Survey which subsequently applied the toponym in 1916 based on the name given to the mountain by Samuel E.S. Allen. Samuel Evans Stokes Allen was a cartographer who mapped this area of the Rockies in the late 1800s and named many peaks. Mount Allen was named after him.

The word "narao" translated from the Stoney language means "hit in the stomach", which may be related to an incident during the 1858 Palliser expedition when a spooked horse kicked James Hector unconscious near here, which also led to the name of Kicking Horse Pass.

The mountain's toponym was officially adopted April 3, 1952, by the Geographical Names Board of Canada.

Geology
Narao Peak is composed of sedimentary rock laid down during the Precambrian to Jurassic periods. Formed in shallow seas, this sedimentary rock was pushed east and over the top of younger rock during the Laramide orogeny.

Climate

Based on the Köppen climate classification, Narao Peak is located in a subarctic climate zone with cold, snowy winters, and mild summers. Temperatures can drop below  with wind chill factors below .

See also

Geography of British Columbia

Gallery

References

External links
 Parks Canada web site: Yoho National Park
 Weather forecast: Narao Peak

Two-thousanders of British Columbia
Canadian Rockies
Mountains of Yoho National Park
Kootenay Land District